The following is a list of women hymnwriters, in order of their year of birth.

Pre-1000 

Kassia the Nun (b. Constantinople, c. 805-810 - d. Casos, 867)

1000-1100 

Heloise (other names not known) (b. 1090–97; d. 16 May 1163/4)
Hildegard of Bingen (b. Bermersheim vor der Höhe, 1098, d. Bingen am Rhein, 17 September 1179)

1200-1300 

Mechthild of Magdeburg (ca. 1207 - ca. 1282)

1300-1400 

Julian of Norwich (1342 - ca. 1416)

1500-1600 

Teresa of Avila (b. Gotarrendura, Avila, Spain, 28 March 1515; d. Alba de Tormes, 4 October 1582)
Christine of Hesse (b. Kassel, 29 June 1543 – d. Kiel, 13 May 1604)

1600-1700 

Countess Emilie Juliane of Barby-Mühlingen (1637 – 1706)
Jeanne Marie Guyon (b. Montargis, France, 16 April 1648; d. 9 January 1717)
Elizabeth Singer Rowe (b. Ilchester, Somerset, 11 September 1674; d. Frome, Somerset, 20 February 1737)
Catharina von Schlegel (1697 - after 1768)

1700-1750 

Anna (Schindler) Dober (b. Kunewald, near Fulneck, Moravia, 9 April 1713; d. Marienborn, near Büdingen, Hesse, 12 December 1739)
Anna Nitschmann (b. 24 November 1715; d. 21 May 1760)
Anne Steele (1717 – 1778)
Henriette Luise von Hayn (b. 22 May 1724; d. 27 August 1782)
Birgitte Katerine Boye (b. Gentofte, Denmark, 7 March 1742; d. 17 October 1824)
Anna Letitita Barbauld (b. Kibworth Harcourt, Leicestershire, 20 June 1743; d. Stoke Newington, London, 9 March 1825)

1750-1800 

Joanna Southcott (b. Taleford, near Ottery St Mary, Devon, 25 April 1750; d. London, 27 December 1814)
Judith Sargent Murray (b. Gloucester, Massachusetts, 1 May 1751; d. Natchez, Mississippi, 9 June 1820)
Susanna Harrison (b. 1752; d. Ipswich, 3 August 1784)
Helen Maria Williams (b. London, 17 June 1759; d. Paris, 15 December 1827)
Harriet Auber (b. Spitalfields, London, 4 August 1773; d. Hoddesdon, Hertfordshire, 20 Jan 1862)
Ann Griffiths (b. Llanfihangel, Montgomeryshire, April 1776; d. Llanfihangel, August 1805)
Ann Taylor Gilbert (b. Islington, London, 30 January 1782, d. Nottingham, 20 December 1866)
Phoebe Hinsdale Brown (b. Canaan, New York State, 1 May 1783; d. Henry, Marshall County, Illinois, 10 October 1861)
Jane Taylor (b. Islington, 23 September 1783, d. Ongar, Essex, 13 April 1824)
Charlotte Elliott (1789 – 1871)
Mary (MacDougall) Macdonald (b. Ardtun, Isle of Mull, 1789; d. Ardtun, 21 May 1872)
Penina Moise (b. Charleston, South Carolina, 23 April 1797; d. Charleston, SC, 13 September 1880)
Abigail Bradley Hyde (1799-1872)
Henrietta Joan Fry (b. Bristol, 6 December 1799; d. Weston-super-Mare, Somerset, 1860)

1800-1850 

Sarah Flower Adams (b. Great Harlow, Essex, 22 February 1805; d. London, 14 August 1848)
Harriet Burn McKeever (b. Philadelphia, Pennsylvania, 28 August 1807; d. Chester, Pennsylvania, 7 February 1886 or 1887)
Margaret Cockburn-Campbell (b. 1808; d. Alphington, near Exeter, Devonshire, 6 February 1841)
Eliza Westbury (b. Hackleton, Northamptonshire, 1808 (Baptized 22 May); d. 11 April 1828)
Anne Houlditch Shepherd (b. Cowes, Isle of Wight, 11 September 1809; d. Blackheath, Kent, 7 January 1857)
Jane Crewdson (b. Perran-ar-worthal, Cornwall, 22 October 1809; d. Whalley Range, Manchester, 14 September 1863)
Catharine H. Esling (b. Philadelphia, Pennsylvania, 12 April 12, 1812; d. Philadelphia, 6 April 1897)
Emma Leslie Toke (b. Holywood, near Belfast, 9 August 1812; d. Ryde, Isle of Wight, 29 September 1878)
Lady Georgiana Charlotte (née Leveson-Gower) Fullerton (b. Tixhall Hall, Staffordshire, 23 September 1812; d. Bournemouth, Hampshire, 19 January 1885)
Mary (Bowly) Peters (b. Cirencester, 17 April 1813; d. Clifton, Bristol, 29 July 1856)
Jemima Luke (b. London, 19 August 1813; d. Newport, Isle of Wight, 2 February 1906)
Mary Duncan (b. Kelso, 26 April 1814; d. Cleish, Kinross-shire, 5 January 1840)
Lucy Akerman (b. Wrentham, Massachusetts, 21 February 1816; d. Providence, Rhode Island, 21 February 1874)
Jane Montgomery Campbell (1817 – 1878)
Elvina M. Hall (1818-1889)
Elizabeth Payson Prentiss (b. Portland, Maine, 26 October 1818; d. Dorset, Vermont, 13 August 1878)
Cecil Frances Alexander (]1818 – ]1895)
Julia Ward Howe (b. New York, 27 May 1819; d. Portsmouth, Rhode Island, 17 October 1910)
Fanny Crosby (1820 – 1915)
Anne Thorton Brontë (b. near Bradford, Yorkshire, 17 January 1820; d. Scarborough, Yorkshire, 28 May 1849)
Charlotte Maria Tucker (b. Friern Hatch, Barnet, 8 May 1821; d Amritsar, India, 2 December 1893)
Martha Matilda Stockton (b. Washington, North Carolina, 12 June 1821; d. Camden, New Jersey, 18 October 1885)
Anna Laetitia Waring (1823 – 1910)
Anne Ross Cundell Cousin (b. Hull, Yorkshire, 27 April 1824; d. Edinburgh, 6 December 1906)
Adelaide Anne Procter (b. London, 30 October 1825; d. London, 2 February 1864)
Julie Hausmann (b. Riga, Latvia, 7 March 1826; d. Wösso (now Võsu, Estonia), 15 August 1901)
Mary Shekleton (b., place and date unknown, 1827; d. Dublin, 28 September 1883)
Anna Bartlett Warner (b. New York, 31 August 1827; d. Constitution Island, 22 January 1915)
Emma Frances Shuttleworth Bevan (b. Oxford, 25 September 1827; d. Cannes, France, 15 March 1909)
Catherine Winkworth (1827 – 1878)
Emily Sullivan Oakey (b. Albany, New York, U.S., 1829; d. Albany, 1883)
Christina Rossetti (1830 – 1894)
Elizabeth Cecilia Douglas Clephane (b. Edinburgh, 18 June 1830; d. Melrose, Roxburghshire, 19 February 1869)
Adelaide Thrupp (b. London, 1831; d. Guildford, Surrey, 1908)
Lina Sandell-Berg (b. 3 October 1832; d. 27 July 1903)
Mary Ann Sidebotham (b. London, 31 July 1833; d. Ryde, Isle of Wight, 20 February 1913)
Marianne Farningham (b. Farningham, Kent, 17 Dec 1834; d. Barmouth, Merioneth, Wales, 16 March 1909)
Eleonore (née Gräfin [Countess] zu Stolberg-Werningerode Reuss (b. Gedern am Vogelsberg, Hesse, 20 February 1835; d. Schloss Ilsenberg, near Bad Harzburg, 18 September 1903)
Annie Sherwood Hawks (b. Hoosick, New York, 25 or 28 May 1835 or 1836; d. Bennington, Vermont, 3 January 1918)
Frances Ridley Havergal (1836 – 1879)
Annie Louisa Coghill (b. Brewood, Staffordshire, 23 June 1836; d. Bath, Somerset, 7 July 1907)
Elizabeth Wordsworth (b. Harrow, Middlesex, 22 June 1840; d. Oxford, 30 November 1932)
Mary Artemisia Lathbury (1841-1913)
Mary "May" Butler (b. 1841, Langar, near Bingham, Nottinghamshire; d. Shrewsbury, Shropshire, 6 January 1916)
Ella Sophia Armitage (b. Liverpool, 3 March 1841; d. Leeds, 20 March 1931)
Clara H. Scott (b. Elk Grove, Cook County, Illinois, 3 December 1841; d. Dubuque, Iowa, 21 June 1897)
Isabella Stephana Stevenson (b. Cheltenham, Gloucestershire, 31 July 1843; d. Cheltenham, 28 April 1890)
Lady Victoria Cecil Evans-Freke Carbury (b. 6 November 1843; d. 22 February 1932)
Annie Herbert Barker (b. Leon, New York State, 1844; d. San Rafael, California, 21 January 1932)
Constance Headlam Coote (b. Tunbridge Wells, Kent, 30 December 1844; d. Tunbridge Wells, 16 August 1936)
Harriet Reynolds Krauth Spaeth (b. Baltimore, Maryland, 21 September 1845; d. Philadelphia, Pennsylvania, 5 May 1925)
Bessie Porter Head (b. 1849/1850, exact date unknown; d. Wimbledon, Surrey, 28 June 1936)
Caroline Maria Noel (b. Teston, Kent, England, 10 April 1817; d. St. Marylebone, Middlesex, England, 7 December 1877)

1850-1900 

Eliza Edmunds Hewitt (b. Philadelphia, Pennsylvania, 28 June 1851; d. Philadelphia, 24 April 1920)
Ellen Lakshmi Goreh (b. Benares (now Varanasi), India, 11 Sept 1853; d. Cawnpore (Kanpur), 1937)
Carrie Elizabeth Ellis Breck (b. Walden, Vermont, 22 January 1855; d. Portland, Oregon, 27 March 1934)
Geneviève Mary Irons (b. Brompton, London, 28 December 1855; d. Eastbourne, Sussex, 13 December 1928)
Dorothy Frances Blomfield Gurney (b. London, 4 October 1858; d. London, 15 June 1932)
Eleanor Henrietta Hull (b. Cheetham, Manchester, 15 Jan 1860; d. Wimbledon, Surrey, 13 Jan 1935)
Ada Rundall Greenaway (1861-1937)
Ada Ruth Habershon (b. Marylebone, London, 8 January 1861; d. London, 1 February 1918)
Lelia Morris (b. Pennsville, Ohio, 15 April 1862; d. Auburn, Ohio, 23 July 1929)
Adelaide Addison Pollard (b. Bloomfield, Iowa, 27 November 1862; d. New York City, 20 December 1934)
Jessie Adams (b. Ipswich, Suffolk, 9 September 1863; d. York, 15 July 1954)
Harriet (Hattie) Pierson (b. Canaan, New York, 1865; d. Sagaponack (a village in the Town of Southampton), New York, 25 February 1921)
Civilla Durfee Holden Martin (b. Jordan, Nova Scotia, 21 August 1866; d. Atlanta, Georgia, 9 March 1948)
Amy Carmichael (b. Millisle, Co Down, Ireland (later Northern Ireland), 16 December 1867; d. Tirunelveli, India, 18 January 1951)
Laura L. Copenhaver (b. Columbus, Texas, 29 August 1868; d. Rosemont, Marion, Virginia, 18 December 1940)
Alda Marguerite Milner-Barry (b. Scothorne (now Scothern), Lincolnshire, 18 August 1875; d. Weston-super-Mare, 15 April 1940)
Frances Whitmarsh Wile (b. Bristol Centre, New York, 2 December 1878; d. Rochester, New York, 31 July 1939)
Mary E. Byrne (b. Dublin, Ireland, 2 July 1880; d. Dublin, 19 January 1931)
Eleanor Farjeon (b. Westminster, London, 13 February 1881; d. Hampstead, London, 5 June 1965)
Lucie Eddie Campbell-Williams (b. Duck Hill, Mississippi, 30 April 1885; d. Nashville, Tennessee, 3 January 1963)
Anna Bernardine Dorthy Hoppe (b. Milwaukee, Wisconsin, 7 May 1889; d. Milwaukee, 2 August 1941)
Mary Susannah Edgar (b. Sundridge, Ontario, 23 May 1889; d. Toronto, 17 September 1973)
Georgia Harkness (b. Harkness, New York (the town was named after her grandfather), 21 April 1891)
Katherine Kennicott Davis (b. St Joseph, Missouri, 25 June 1892; d. Concord, Massachusetts, 20 April 1980)
Maria Ferschl (b. Melk, Austria, 18 March 1895; d. Saulgau, Baden-Württemberg, 10 April 1982)
Avis Christiansen (1895-1985)
Helen Kim (b. Inchon, Korea, 27 February 1899; d. Seoul, Republic of Korea (South Korea), 10 February 1970)

1900-1950 

Miriam (Leyrer) Drury (b. Santa Ana, California, 1900; d. Pasadena, California, 1985)
Ruth Carter (b. Clapton, London, 22 August 1900; d. Clacton, Essex, 4 November 1982)
Anastasia Van Burkalow (b. Buchanan, New York, 16 March 1911; d. Wantage, New Jersey, 14 January 2004)
Maria Luise Thurmair (b. Bozen, Süd Tirol, Austria (now Bolzano, Alto Adige, Italy), 27 September 1912; d. Germering, München, 24 October 2005)
Pilar Manalo Danao (b. Santa Ana, Manila, 10 March 1914: d. 26 November 1987)
Honor Mary Thwaites (b. Young, New South Wales, Australia, 21 September 1914; d. Canberra, 24 November 1993)
Anna Martina Gottschick (b. Dresden, 29 Sept 1914; d. Kassel. 8 Nov 1995)
Margaret Clarkson (b. Melville, Saskatchewan, Canada, 8 June 1915; d. Toronto, 17 March 2008)
Olive Adelaide (Wise) Spannaus (b. St Louis, Missouri, 23 January 1916; d. Seattle, Washington, 10 May 2018)
Audrey Mae Mieir (b. Leechburg, Pennsylvania, 12 May 1916; d. 3 November 1996)
Doris Akers (b. Brookfield, Missouri, 21 May 1922; d. Minneapolis, Minnesota, 26 July 1995)
Estelle White (b. South Shields, County Durham (now in Tyne and Wear), 4 December 1925; d. 9 February 2011)
Alice Parker (b. Boston, 16 December 1925)
Jane McAfee Parker Huber (b. Jinan, China, 24 October 1926; d. Hanover, Indiana, 15 November 2008)
Mary Louise Enigson VanDyke (b. Rochester, Pennsylvania, 28 Feb 1927)
Catherine Cameron (b. St John, New Brunswick, Canada, 27 March 1927)
Lois Clara Kroehler (b. Saint Louis, Missouri, 9 September 1927; d. Bremerton, Washington, 3 August 2019)
Cecily Taylor (b. Coulsdon, Surrey, 25 March 1930)
Judith Beatrice O'Neill (b. Melbourne, Australia, 3 June 1930)
Natalie Sleeth (1930-2002)
Shirley Erena Murray (b. Invercargill, New Zealand, 31 March 1931; d. Wellington, NZ, 25 January 2020)
Jocelyn Mary Marshall (b. Morrinsville, Waikato, New Zealand, 15 September 1931)
Carol Owens (b. El Reno, Oklahoma, 30 October 1931)
Marian Collihole (. Pontypridd, Wales, 14 August 1933
Dottie Rambo (b. Madisonville, Kentucky, 2 March 1934; d. Mount Vernon, Missouri, 11 May 2008)
Eluned (Cornish) Harrison (b. Cardiff, South Wales, 19 December 1934)
Jill Jenkins (b. Ealing, west London, 14 October 1937)
Miriam Therese Winter (b. Passaic, New Jersey, 14 June 1938)
Delores Dufner (b. near Buxton, North Dakota, 20 February 1939)
Alison Margaret Robertson (b. Glasgow, 22 February 1940)
Claire Cloninger (b. Lafayette, Louisiana, 12 August 1942; d. 15 August 2019)
Simei Monteiro (b. Belém, Brazil, 28 December 1943)
Ruth C. Duck (b. Washington, DC, 21 November 1944)
Anna Briggs (b. Newcastle upon Tyne, 15 February 1947)

1950-present 

Kathy Galloway (b. Dumfries, Scotland, 6 August 1952)
Margaret Louise Barrell (b. Ashburton, New Zealand, 30 December 1952)
Susan Palo Cherwien (b. Ashtabula, Ohio, 4 May 1954, d. 28 December 2021)
Mary Louise Bringle (b. Ripley, Tennessee, 31 July 1953)
Mary Yoke Thue Gan (. Jasin, Melaka, Malaysia, 14 November 1954) 
Sylvia Dunstan (b. Simcoe, Ontario, Canada, 26 May 1955; d. 25 July 1993)
Elizabeth Smith (b. Stawell, Victoria, Australia, 27 February 1956)
Maggi Eleanor Dawn (b. 1959)
Geraldine Latty (b. 1963)
Darlene Joyce Zscech (b. Brisbane, Queensland, Australia, 8 September 1965)
Kristyn Getty (born 1980)
Emma Turl (b. 1946)

References

hymn